The Barrow Raiders, the English professional rugby league team from Barrow-in-Furness, Cumbria, competed in the second tier competition of British rugby league, the 2009 Co-operative Championship.

Table

2009 Fixtures and results

References

Barrow Raiders season
Barrow Raiders
English rugby league club seasons